Zum Stachel is one of the oldest German inns located in Würzburg, Franconia, Bavaria. In 1413 the butcher Hanns Rehlein and his wife and landlady Margarete bought the "Gressenhof" for 200 guldens and founded a gastronomic tradition.

In the summer visitors can use a vine-draped outdoor courtyard, where are served wines from the restaurant's own vineyards.

See also 
List of oldest companies

References

External links 
Homepage in German
Profile in German with many photos

Hotels in Germany
Restaurants in Germany
Companies established in the 15th century
15th-century establishments in the Holy Roman Empire